Garry Williamson Barnes (born 24 January 1982), formerly known as Garry Williamson, is an English footballer who played in the Football League for Darlington. He joined West Auckland Town before the 2010–11 season.

Career
Barnes was born in Darlington and joined his home-town club in 1997. Then known as Garry Williamson, he turned professional in 2000 and made his Football League debut for Darlington on 12 August 2000 as a second-half substitute in a 1–1 draw away at Rochdale. He made five more appearances in League Two, and four in cup competitions, and spent some time on loan at Northern Premier League club Spennymoor United.

At the end of the 2000–01 season, Williamson turned down Darlington's offer of a contract extension, preferring to move to the United States to take up a scholarship at Yavapai College, Arizona, where he led the 2001 offensive rankings for Division 1 of the National Junior College Athletic Association.

He returned to England and, by then using the surname Barnes, signed for Shildon of the Northern League, for whom he scored 53 goals in 52 appearances in the 2003–04 season, a performance which earned him the award of Northern League Player of the Year, and his 34 league goals made him the season's top scorer. In the same season, Shildon reached the First Round Proper of the FA Cup, only to be beaten by Notts County of Division Two – five levels above Shildon – 7–2; Barnes, who had scored eight goals during the qualifying rounds, added a 63rd-minute penalty.

Before the 2005–06 season Barnes left Shildon for rivals Durham City, but a few months later he moved on again, this time to Newcastle Blue Star, with whom he won the Northern League title. He began the next season at Tow Law Town, but joined West Auckland Town during the season, and was leading scorer for the club in 2008–09. He joined Spennymoor Town for the 2009–10 season, and helped them win the Northern League title but then left at the close of that season due to work commitments. Barnes rejoined West Auckland in August 2010.

References

External links
 

1982 births
Living people
Footballers from Darlington
English footballers
Association football forwards
Darlington F.C. players
Spennymoor United F.C. players
Durham City A.F.C. players
Newcastle Blue Star F.C. players
West Auckland Town F.C. players
Spennymoor Town F.C. players
English Football League players
Tow Law Town F.C. players
Shildon A.F.C. players